Heteroclytomorpha punctata is a species of beetle in the family Cerambycidae. It was described by Charles Joseph Gahan in 1888. It is known from the Solomon Islands.

References

Homonoeini
Beetles described in 1888